AGV Sports Group, Inc., based in Frederick, Maryland, designs and develops safety apparel for motorcycle road racing and sport use as well as snowmobile and bicycling apparel.

History
In 1947 Gino Amisano created AGV SpA. (Amisano Gino Valenza), a helmet manufacturer in Italy. In 1977 Michael Parrotte formed AGV USA after being granted the exclusive rights to distribute AGV helmets in the U.S. market by Gino Amisano, the founder of AGV. In 1985 AGV licensed AGV Sport to design and produce apparel and other products, excluding helmets, bearing the AGV name and trademark. The unique model of licensing the brand in different countries was the direct result of the original licensing agreement between AGV SpA and AGV Sports Group. By the early 1990s the AGVSPORT logo had replaced the AGV logo on most apparel for aesthetics reasons due to the different graphic requirements of apparel from helmets. From 1992 until 1995 AGV SpA in Italy owned a 51% stake in AGV Sports Group, Inc.

From 1985 to 1999, AGV Sports Group and AGV Helmets US office operated with the same management, offices, and warehouses. In 2001, the AGVSPORT brand name became a fully independent brand belonging to AGV Sports Group, Inc., a privately held US corporation.

In 2017 AGVSPORT America LLC purchased the rights for the AGVSPORT brand in the United States from AGV Sports Group, Inc. AGVSPORT America, LLC is a newly formed company with headquarters in the Dallas, Texas area. 

The AGVSPORT brand is distributed internationally through exclusive licensing contracts with current agreements with companies in Canada, Russia, Ukraine, Spain, Italy, Malaysia, Korea, Mexico, India, Australia, Thailand, Brazil, Argentina, Panama and Chile.

Sponsorship
AGVSPORT has been the official leather manufacturer of Keith Code's California Superbike School since 1989. For more than 25 years the school have relied on the  AGVSPORT suits to protect the hundreds of riders who pass through their school each season.

AGV Sports Group sponsored racers
AGV Sports Group has sponsored riders including road racers 
  Troy Bayliss
  Randy Mamola
  Loris Capirossi
  Kurtis Roberts
  Ben Bostrom
  Eric Bostrom
  Roland Sands
  Miguel Duhamel
  Mat Mladin.

References

External links

 AGV Sports Group Official World Website
 AGV Sports Canada
 AGVSPORT America LLC United States
 AGV Sports Panama
 AGV Sports Ukraine
 AGV Sports Russia
 AGV Sports Korea
 AGV Sports India
 AGV Sports Thailand
 AGV Sports Australia
 AGV Sports Chile
 Michael Parrotte Official Website
 AGV Sport Spain Maximo Moto official 

Motorcycle safety gear manufacturers
Clothing brands of the United States
Sporting goods brands
Manufacturing companies based in Maryland
Companies based in Frederick County, Maryland
Frederick, Maryland